The Carnaval de Ponce (English: Ponce Carnival), officially Carnaval Ponceño, is an annual celebration held in Ponce, Puerto Rico. The celebration lasts one week and it ends on the day before Ash Wednesday. Thus, it is generally held in February and sometimes in March. It is one of the oldest carnivals of the Western Hemisphere, dating back to 1858. Some authorities, such as the Smithsonian Institution, believe the Ponce Carnaval can be traced to as far back as 250 years ago. The Carnaval coincides with the Mardi Gras of New Orleans, the Carnival of Venice, and Rio de Janeiro's Carnival. The estimated attendance is 100,000. Scenes of the 2011 Carnaval Ponceño were featured in the Travel Channel on 7 August 2011.

History

There are no documents stating the official origin of the Carnaval, but there are documents mentioning the celebration as early as 1858. The Carnaval de Ponce thus began in 1858 and was started as a mask dance by a Spaniard by the name of José de la Guardia. The masquerade dance continued as a tradition through the years, but it was not until the 1950s that the municipal government added the parade to the Carnaval. In the early 1960s, the Carnaval began to integrate floats that represented civic and cultural institutions, public and private residential communities, schools, colleges and universities, banking, industry and commerce. The Office of Cultural Development of the Municipality of Ponce explains that “it is believed that the influence of the Nice Carnival extended to Barcelona and that immigrants from Barcelona brought it to Ponce. With the passing of time Poceans have added their own touches with Afro-Antillean music that fills the celebrations with percussion, rhythm and happiness."

In June 1995, Carnaval de Ponce was taken to New York City where, during the Puerto Rican Day Parade, over 200 entertainers, folk artists and musicians from Ponce, in addition to the Banda Municipal de Ponce and the Carnival's Queen and Child Queen, marched down New York's Fifth Avenue as part of that City's Puerto Rican Day Celebration. During the week leading to the Parade, folk artists from the Carnaval de Ponce, toured the City teaching children to make the traditional Ponce carnival's masks. In 2012, a local news weekly called Carnaval de Ponce "Puerto Rico's National Carnival".

Costumes and masks

One of the traditions of the Carnaval is the appearance of the "vejigantes", which is a colorful costume traditionally representing the devil or evil. Vejigantes carry blown cow bladders with which they make sounds and hit carnival attendees throughout the processions.

The traditional vejigante masks of the Ponce carnival are made of paper mache and are characterized by the presence of multiple horns. The mask was developed by Ponce artisans in the early part of the 20th century. They are made from newsprint paper mixed with homemade glue and paint. Sophisticated Ponce carnival masks are sought after by mask collectors and masks from Ponce have become a symbol of Puerto Rico at large.

The Carnaval ends with the Burial of the Sardine, at which point everyone sings a song in Spanish that translates into: The burial of the Sardine event started in 1967. (The Ball Dance was also started in 1967.The burial of the Sardine event started in 1967.

The Carnival is dead now
They are burying him;
Throw just a little dirt in
So he can rise again.

Economics
The municipal government invests close to $100,000 in the Carnival and the event infuses some $500,000 into the city's economy.

List of events
The Carnaval starts on the Wednesday before Ash Wednesday, and the events are as follows.

Wednesday: Vejigantes Party
Thursday: King Momo Entrance Parade
Friday: Crowning of the Child Queen
Saturday: Crowning of the Carnival Adult Queen
Sunday: Main Parade
Monday: Carnival's Ball Dance
Tuesday: Burial of the Sardine

Carnaval queens and child queens

In 1959, the Carnaval introduced the crowning of a Carnaval queen. This was followed, in 1973, with the crowning of a Carnaval child queen. The following are the Carnaval queens and child queens.

Carnaval Queens

Carnaval Child queens

See also
 Feria de Artesanías de Ponce
 Ponce Jazz Festival
 Fiesta Nacional de la Danza
 Día Mundial de Ponce
 Festival Nacional de la Quenepa
 Bienal de Arte de Ponce
 Festival de Bomba y Plena de San Antón
 Carnaval de Vejigantes
 Festival Nacional Afrocaribeño

Notes

References

External links
Carnaval information at StudioPorto
Carnaval information at EnCarnaval.com
Al Carnaval de Ponce at Primera Hora
Carnaval information at Puerto Rico Museum of Art
Slide show of the Carnival
SHOPPER'S WORLD; Puerto Rican Carnival Masks. Mark Kurlansky. The New York Times. 1990. (NYT: News about masks, vegigantes, etc.)

February events
March events
Carnivals in Puerto Rico
Annual events in Puerto Rico
Recurring events established in 1858
Festivals in Ponce, Puerto Rico
1858 establishments in Puerto Rico
Events in Ponce, Puerto Rico